SIMÁN is a department store from El Salvador, has 100 years of operation and currently has regionalized along Central America.

History 
SIMÁN was founded on December 8, 1921, by Don J. J. Simán, of Palestinian origin, when he decided to open a small shop in the commercial area of the San Salvador downtown. Its first name was "JOSE J. SIMÁN ", then when the children integrated into the business, its name changed to" JOSE J. SIMÁN e HIJOS. "Later it was incorporated as a limited company under the name: "ALMACENES SIMÁN S.A." For the 1960s, the store moved to larger premises in the Salvadoran capital downtown, later becoming a limited company with variable capital so that now the name is "ALMACENES SIMÁN S.A. de C.V. "(ALSISA)

Its construction began in 1967 and then became in 1970 in the first department store in El Salvador and the largest in Central America.
The store transfer its operations to the new branch in the "Plaza Mundo" shopping mall in September 2010 and it is currently headquartered in the Lifestyle Center La Gran Via.

In 1974 is built on the downtown branch, now closed, an ample parking and is an expansion of the original store located in the center of the capital.

In 1983, Almacenes SIMÁN decided to expand its operations by acquiring a building located in the largest shopping center of El Salvador, for then and now Metrocentro.

In 1986, due to the earthquake that shook the city of San Salvador, the Central Branch is damaged, so it was decided to open a small branch in La Casona located in Colonia Escalon in San Salvador. There is currently operating the Centro Comercial Galerias.

In 1990 is opened the third branch of Departments in the second largest city of El Salvador, Santa Ana with a total sales area of over 1,500 square meters, and then is moved to the  Metrocentro Santa Ana shopping mall in the year 1998.

In 1993, Almacenes SIMÁN extended to the neighboring country Guatemala in a branch in Los Próceres Shopping Center located in Zona 10 of Guatemala City.

In 1994, Almacenes SIMÁN opens a fourth branch in San Miguel, the third largest city of El Salvador.

On December 7, 1994, officially inaugurated the branch Galerias, located in the Centro Comercial Galerias shopping center, where La Casona is located. (corporate offices were located in this shopping center).

In 2002 Almacenes SIMÁN acquired the Galerias Santo Domingo Shopping Center in the capital of Nicaragua, beginning operations in a third Central American country.

In 2003, SIMÁN opened its second store in the Republic of Guatemala, in the trendy Miraflores mall.

In 2004 SIMÁN opened a new store in the Lifestyle Center La Gran Via in Antiguo Cuscatlan in El Salvador.

On November 6, 2008 opened its third store in Guatemala City, located in Zona 10 in the Oakland Mall. In the same month, is opened a branch in the Metrocentro Managua Shopping mall in Nicaragua.

Later expands in 2009 by opening operations in Costa Rica in the newest Mall of Grupo Roble, Multiplaza in the city of Escazu in the capital San Jose.

In 2010, they opened another branch in Soyapango, located in stage IV of Plaza Mundo shopping mall to replace the branch closed in the downtown of the capital.

In  2015 opened the fourth store in Guatemala City, located in Carretera a El Salvador in the Pradera Concepcion Mall.

Campaign "Es Tiempo De Vivir" (Is Time to live) new image 2010 
In order to update the image of SIMÁN, the singer David Bisbal was hired in 2010, touring Central America and launching the new image of the company with the campaign "Tribute to women" and "It is Time to live."

The campaign was successful as the first to win a prize billboard in Central America, for the best marketing campaign using an artist David Bisbal.

"Tribute to women" (Base of the campaign)

Branches 
 :
 Lifestyle Center La Gran Via
 Centro Comercial Galerias
 Metrocentro San Salvador
 Metrocentro Santa Ana
 Metrocentro San Miguel
 Plaza Mundo
 :
 Centro Comercial Próceres
 Centro Comercial Miraflores
 Centro Comercial Oakland
 Centro comercial Pradera Concepcion
 :
 Galerías Santo Domingo
 Metrocentro Managua
 :
 Multiplaza Escazú
 Multiplaza del Este

Alliance Inditex 

ALSISA is in charge of operating the franchise since 2002 of the Spanish group Inditex in Central America with the clothing stores Zara, Pull and Bear, Bershka, Massimo Dutti and Stradivarius.

It began operations with the opening of the first store Zara in Central America located in El Salvador, now has 18 stores which are located in:

See also 
 Lifestyle Center La Gran Via
 Centro Comercial Galerias

References

External links 
 www.siman.com

San Salvador
Department stores of El Salvador
Retail companies established in 1921
Companies of El Salvador
Salvadoran brands